Ares J. Rosakis, Theodore von Kármán Professor of Aeronautics and Professor of Mechanical Engineering at the California Institute of Technology. He was also the fifth Director of the Graduate Aerospace Laboratories, known as (GALCIT), and formerly known as Guggenheim Aeronautical Laboratory, and was the Otis Booth Leadership Chair, of the Division of Engineering and Applied Science.

Education and career 

Ares Rosakis graduated from Athens College, a Greek American high school, in June 1975. He received both his Bachelors and Masters of Arts degrees from Oxford University. He received his SCM (1980) and PhD (1982) degrees in engineering (solid mechanics and structures with a minor in materials science) from Brown University. He began at the California Institute of Technology (Caltech) as an assistant professor in 1982. He named associate professor in 1988 and full professor in 1993. In 2004, he was named the “Theodore von Kármán Professor” of Aeronautics and Professor of Mechanical Engineering.

He served as Interim Director (2003-2004) and Director (2004-2009) of the Graduate Aerospace Laboratories (GALCIT) formerly known as the Guggenheim Aeronautical Laboratories.

In 2005, Rosakis was a Distinguished Visiting Professor in the Dept. of Terre Atmosphére-Océan, École Normale Supérieure Paris, France. In 2008, he held the prestigious Astor Visiting Professorship at the University of Oxford. In early 2018 he held a Distinguished Simpson Visiting Professorship at Northwestern University and a Distinguished Nanyang Visiting Professorship at Nanyang Technological University (NTU) in Singapore.

Between 2009 and 2015, he was Chair of the Division of Engineering and Applied Science (EAS) at Caltech. In June 2013, Rosakis was named the F. Otis Booth Leadership Chair in addition to his academic, Theodore von Kármán, chair. Rosakis was the first holder of such a Leadership Chair at Caltech. Between 2009 and 2015 he also served as a member of all three of Caltech's Governing bodies, the Institute's Academic Council (IACC), the Institute's Administrative Council (IAC), as an Ex-Officio Member of the Institutes’ Faculty Board and between 2005 and 2014 as member of JPL’s Advisory council.

Rosakis is a member of both the National Academy of Sciences (NAS), and the National Academy of Engineering (NAE). As such, he is one of only seventy living Americans to be elected to membership in both the NAS and the NAE branches of the US National Academies. He has also been elected to the American Academy of Arts and Sciences (AAA&S) as well as five more Academies in Europe and India: Indian National Academy of Engineering (INAE), Academia Europaea (AE), European Academy of Sciences and Arts (Academia Scientiarum et Artium Europaea), Academy of Athens (National Academy of Greece), European Academy of Science (EUAS).

Honors and awards 
Rosakis has been honored with various recognitions in many branches of Engineering and Science including, Reliability of Materials, Optics and Instrumentation design, Failure of Solid Materials with applications in micro-electronics, Aerospace and Civil Engineering structures and in Earthquake Source Mechanics.

 2021 - Received the Zdenek Bazant Medal for Failure and Damage Prevention (ASCE) “For ground breaking contributions to Earthquake Mechanics, specifically for inventing “laboratory Earthquakes” which have transformed our understanding of failure and damage processes in the Earth that have proven central to infrastructure damage prevention”. This medal is the only recognition exclusively devoted to the field of materials failure.
 2021 - Recipient of the Horace Mann Medal (Distinguished alumnus award) “For his research and mentoring skills, as well as being a champion of societal impact that can be realized through the sciences”, and was a 2021 Commencement Forum speaker at Brown University.
 2020 - Elected member of the European Academy of Sciences  (EURASC).
 2019 - Awarded the Aurel Stodola Medal from ETH Zurich.
 2018 - Received the Stephen P. Timoshenko Medal from the American Society of Mechanical Engineers, (ASME) “For pioneering contributions to the mechanics of dynamic failure of geological materials and systems, earthquake source physics and seismic hazard mitigation”. The Timoshenko Medal is the flagship award in the field of Mechanics of Materials and one of ASME's oldest and highest honors.
 2017 - Elected honorary International Congress on Fracture fellow (IFC).
 2017 - Elected fellow of the American Association for the Advancement of Science (AAAS).
 2017 - Elected fellow of the American Geophysical Union (AGU) for “For monumental achievements in the field of experimental fracture dynamics that have transformed our understanding of earthquake rupture processes”.
 2016  - Received the Theodore von Kármán Medal from the American Society of Civil Engineers (ASCE) for “discovering several fundamental physical phenomena in dynamic fracture of heterogeneous materials and interfaces at various length and time scales”. This Medal is ASCE's highest recognition.
 2016 - Elected member of US National Academy of Sciences (NAS).
 2015 - Given the Sia Nemat-Nasser Medal from the same society “for his interdisciplinary utilization of experimental mechanics to advance other fields of science, in particular Earthquake Source Mechanics”.
 2014 - Elected member of Academia Europaea (AE).
 2013 - Received the P.S. Theocaris Award from the Society for Experimental Mechanics “for his lifelong contribution to experimental science and mechanics”.
 2013 - Elected foreign fellow of Indian National Academy of Engineering (INAE).
 2013 - Elected member of European Academy of Sciences and Arts (Academia Scientiarum et Artium Europaea).
 2013 - Elected corresponding Member of Academy of Athens (National Academy of Greece).
 2012 - Made Commander of the Order of Academic Palms (Commandeur dans l'Ordre des Palmes Académiques) by the Prime Minister of the Republic of France “for his eminent contribution to French Engineering and Technical Education”.

 2011 - Received the A.C. Eringen Medal from the Society of Engineering Science (SES).
 2011 - Elected member of US National Academy of Engineering(NAE).
 2010 - Awarded the Brown Engineering Alumnus Medal (BEAM) and the Robert Henry Thurston Award from the American Society of Mechanical Engineers (ASME).
 2009 - Elected Society for Experimental Mechanics (SEM) fellow for having made significant accomplishments to the field of mechanics.
 2009 - Elected fellow of American Academy of Arts and Sciences (AAA&S).
 2007 - Received the D.R. Harting Award from the Society for Experimental Mechanics (SEM) for the "Best Paper" published in Experimental Mechanics.
 2005 - Received the William M. Murray Medal and Lecture “for his life-long contributions to the development and application of advanced methods for accurate measurement of transient, dynamic phenomena”.
 2003 - Received the Frocht Award, which recognizes “outstanding achievement as an educator in the field of experimental mechanics”.
 1996 - Awarded the B. L. Lazan Award recognizing individuals who have made outstanding original technical contributions to experimental mechanics.
 1992 - Received the Hetényi Award, an honor given for the best research paper published in Experimental Mechanics.
 1989 - Awarded the Rudolf Kingslake Medal and Prize from the International Society of Optical Engineering (SPIE) for his work in designing optical diagnostics.
 1985 - Received the U.S. Presidential Young Investigator Award (White House 1985, awarded by US President Ronald Reagan).

Research 
 Rosakis is the author of more than 260 works on quasi-static and dynamic failure of metals, composites, interfaces and micro-electronic structures, with emphasis on the use of high speed visible and IR diagnostics and laser interferometry for the study of thermal fatigue, catastrophic failure and dynamic localization. His early work includes the study of dynamic, ductile failure of structural metals by using high speed photography, the real-time measurement of temperature fields at the vicinity of dynamically growing cracks and adiabatic shear bands and the development of a variety of optical and dynamic infrared diagnostic methods. He and his coworkers invented Coherent Gradient Sensing, CGS, interferometry, a method sensitive to gradients of optical path gradients which has been used in both fracture mechanics and thin film stress and reliability measurements at the wafer level. Other interests include dynamic fragmentation; shear dominated intersonic rupture of inhomogeneous materials and composites, rupture mechanics of crustal earthquakes, shielding of spacecraft from hypervelocity micrometeoroid impact threats, the reliability of thin films and wafer level optical metrology. Rosakis holds thirteen US patents on thin-film stress measurement and in situ wafer level metrology as well as on high speed infrared thermography.

In the late eighties, Rosakis introduced the concept of "laboratory earthquakes" and since then his research interests have included on the mechanics of seismology, the physics of dynamic shear rupture and frictional sliding and on laboratory seismology. The goal of this body of work is to create, in a controlled and repeatable environment, surrogate laboratory earthquake scenarios mimicking various dynamic shear rupture process occurring in natural earthquake events. Such, highly instrumented, experiments are used to observe new physical phenomena and to also create benchmark comparisons with existing analysis and field observations. The experiments use high-speed photography, full-field photoelasticity, digital image correlation (DIC) and laser velocimetry as diagnostics. The fault systems are simulated using two photoelastic plates held together in frictional contact. The far field tectonic loading is simulated by pre-compression while the triggering of dynamic rupture (spontaneous nucleation) is achieved by suddenly dropping the normal stress in a small region along the interface. The frictional interface (fault) forms various angles with the compression axis to provide the shear driving force necessary for continued rupturing. Rosakis and his co-workers, investigate the characteristics of rupture, such as rupture speed, rupture mode, associated ground motion under various conditions such as tectonic load, interface complexity and roughness.  Both homogeneous and bimaterial interfaces (abutted by various elastic and damaged media) are investigated. Rosakis and his coworkers have been credited with the experimental discovery of the "intersonic" or "supershear rupture" phenomenon. They also have investigated this new phenomenon in various engineering and geophysical settings involving shear dominated rupture in the presence of weak interfaces or faults. Their experimental discoveries of supershear rupture has refocused the attention of the geophysics community to the study of supershear earthquakes.

Another recent research interest for Rosakis is hypervelocity impact. Hypervelocity impact is a rising concern in spacecraft missions where man-made debris in low Earth orbit (LEO) and meteoroids are capable of compromising or depleting the structural integrity of spacecraft. To address these concerns, the goal of current research is to experimentally investigate the underlying mechanisms responsible for deformation and damage evolution during hypervelocity impact utilizing Caltech/JPL's Small Particle Hypervelocity Impact Range (SPHIR) facility. By combining high speed photography, optical, spectroscopic and infrared techniques, including Coherent Gradient Sensing (CGS) interferometry, the dynamic perforation behavior involving crater morphology, debris and ejecta formation and solid/fluid/plasma transitions and interactions have been examined.

Academic leadership 

2009 – 2015, as EAS Division Chair
 For three years in a row Engineering and Technology at Caltech was ranked #1 by the Times Higher Education World University Ranking (Thomson Reuters) for 2010–2011, 2011–2012, and 2012–2013. 
 Presided over the structural re-organization of the Division of Engineering and Applied Science (EAS) at Caltech.
 Replaced the amorphous degree option structure with seven EAS departments and presided over their administrative restructuring.
 Introduced a system of multiple fundraising advisory councils, composed of Caltech alumni and Institute trustees, corresponding to each new department.
 Established the Center for Technology and Management Education (CTME) which provides executive training, courses and certificate programs to international companies and government agencies.
 Involved in the establishment and oversight of the Resnick Energy Sustainability Institute which aims to foster transformational advances in energy science and technology through research, education, and communication. 
 Member of the oversight board for the Joint Center for Artificial Photosynthesis (JCAP) with the mission to keep the United States at the forefront of solar fuel research.
 Oversaw the fundraising and renovation of the Jorgensen Laboratory to serve as the new home for two of Caltech's key energy and sustainability research efforts: the Resnick Institute and the Joint Center for Artificial Photosynthesis. 
 Presided over, along with the Chair of the Division of Geology and Planetary Sciences, the establishment of the interdisciplinary Terrestrial Hazard Observation and Reporting (THOR) Center.
 Established a graduate student exchange program between the Caltech's Division of Engineering and Applied Science and Institut Supérieur de l'Aéronautique et de l'Espace, located in Toulouse, France.
 Appointed by the President of Ecuador as a founding member of the Board of Trustees of Yachay International University.
 Created a partnership program with the Indian Space Research Organization (ISRO) and established the “Satish Dhawan” endowed fellowship sponsored by ISRO and the Government of India. Also created the “Abdul Kalam” prize in Aerospace.
 Established the Charles M. Vest Engineering Grand Challenges Scholarship at Caltech for International collaboration (endorsed by NAE and RAE).
 Founded the new Department of Medical Engineering at Caltech within the Division of Engineering and Applied Science.
 Facilitated the establishment of the Caltech - Northrop Grumman Space Solar Power Initiative (SSPI).
 Spearheaded the establishment of the Foster and Coco Stanback Center for Autonomous Systems and Technology (CAST).

2004 – 2009, as Director of GALCIT
 Led the initiative to revitalize the Graduate Aerospace Laboratories (GALCIT).  Caltech was ranked #1 or #2 in Aerospace Engineering for the last six years by the U.S. News & World Report.
 Five new faculty members hired between 2005 and 2007, increased the size of GALCIT faculty by 40%.
 Established Masters Program in Space Engineering, in collaboration with the Jet Propulsion Laboratory (JPL); initiated follow-on PhD program in Space Engineering; guaranteed the long-term viability of these programs through new fundraising for lectureships and fellowships.
 Established a two-year dual masters' program between GALCIT and École Polytechnique in France. The program received the 2010 Andrew Heiskell Award for Innovation in International Education from the Institute of International Education in New York. 
 Established a Master's of PhD exchange program with the Government of Andalucía and the University of Seville.
 Oversaw extensive fundraising and renovation of the historic Guggenheim Laboratory following removal of 10-foot wind tunnel. Four labs built, the Laboratory for Large Space Structures, the Allen Puckett Laboratory of Computational Fluid Mechanics, the Gordon Cann Laboratory of Experimental Innovation, and the Joseph Charyk Center for Bio-Inspired Design; Kármán Conference room renovated and GALCIT Archives created (made possible by Robert Herzog); and extensive new classroom, conference, office, and social spaces created.
 Established the GALCIT Director's advisory board to extend the fundraising reach of GALCIT.
 Contributed to the establishment of the Keck Institute for Space Studies at Caltech and JPL.
 Led systematic effort to formally involve GALCIT and EAS faculty in joint research projects with JPL, the newly established Keck Institute for Space Studies, and the aerospace industry.
 Co-organized (with JPL and Northrop Grumman) an international conference to celebrate the 50th Anniversary of Space Exploration.
 Incorporated the Aerospace Historical Society (AHS) into GALCIT and became its president.  Among other outreach activities the Society is annually responsible for awarding the International von Kármán Wings Award.

National and international academy memberships 

 2020 - Elected member of the European Academy of Sciences.(EURASC)
 2016 - Elected member of US National Academy of Sciences. (NAS)
 2014 - Elected member of Academia Europaea. (AE)
 2013 - Elected foreign fellow of Indian National Academy of Engineering. (INAE)
 2013 - Elected member of European Academy of Sciences and Arts. (Academia Scientiarum et Artium Europaea)
 2013 - Elected corresponding Member of Academy of Athens. (National Academy of Greece)
 2011 - Elected member of US National Academy of Engineering. (NAE)
 2009 - Elected fellow of American Academy of Arts and Sciences. (AAA&S)

External links
 "Ares J. Rosakis | California Institute of Technology" rosakis.caltech.edu. Retrieved 2012-01-24.
 http://www.eas.caltech.edu/people/3177/profile
 Curriculum Vitae of Ares Rosakis

References

Living people
California Institute of Technology faculty
Members of the United States National Academy of Engineering
Members of the United States National Academy of Sciences
American mechanical engineers
1956 births
Brown University School of Engineering alumni
Fellows of the American Association for the Advancement of Science
Fellows of the Society for Experimental Mechanics